The  is an electric multiple unit (EMU) train type operated by Tokyo Metro for use on the Marunouchi Line in Tokyo, Japan. They will replace the Tokyo Metro 02 series currently in service on the Marunouchi Line.

Technical specifications 
The trains are built by Nippon Sharyo and Kinki Sharyo, with Toshiba supplying the electrical equipment. They are fitted with permanent magnet synchronous motors and silicon carbide traction inverters, which are expected to reduce the power consumption by about 20%, compared to the Tokyo Metro 02 series currently in service on the Marunouchi Line.

Self-steering axles similar to those of the 1000 series are fitted to the bogies.

Formation 
The trains are formed as six-car sets.

Interior 
The seating accommodation consists of longitudinal seating. The cars are air conditioned, with feature round windows at the car ends. They also have power outlets for passengers to charge their mobile devices.

History 
In March 2018, Tokyo Metro announced plans to introduce a new fleet of 53 six-car sets (318 cars) for the Marunouchi Line, which would replace the Tokyo Metro 02 series. The first trainset was unveiled to the press on 11 October 2018. The trains are scheduled to enter revenue service in February 2019, with the introduction of all 53 sets by fiscal 2022. The trains entered service on 23 February 2019. In March 2020, it was announced that the number of sets has been reduced to 52 sets (312 cars), being delivered until fiscal 2023.

Build histories 

The delivery dates for the fleet are as shown below.

References 

Electric multiple units of Japan
2000 series
Train-related introductions in 2019
600 V DC multiple units
Nippon Sharyo multiple units
Kinki Sharyo multiple units